The 2018 season was FC Seoul's 35th season in the K League 1.

Pre-season
 In Murcia, Spain: From 6 January 2018 to 7 February 2018 
 In Kagoshima, Japan: From 14 February 2018 to 22 February 2018

Pre-season match results

Competitions

Overview

K League 1

FA Cup

Match reports and match highlights
Fixtures and Results at FC Seoul Official Website

Season statistics

K League 1 records

All competitions records

Attendance records

 Season total attendance is K League 1, FA Cup, and AFC Champions League combined

Squad statistics

Goals

Assists

Coaching staff

Hwang Sun-hong Era (~2018-04-30)

Lee Eul-yong Era (2018-04-30~2018-10-11)

Choi Yong-soo Era (2018-10-11~)

Players

Team squad
All players registered for the 2018 season are listed.

Out on loan and military service

Note: Where a player has not declared an international allegiance, nation is determined by place of birth.
※ In: Transferred from other teams in the middle of the season.
※ Out: Transferred to other teams in the middle of the season.
※ Discharged: Transferred from Sanjgu Sangmu or Ansan Mugunghwa for military service in the middle of the season (registered in 2019 season).
※ Conscripted: Transferred to Sangju Sangmu or Ansan Mugunghwa for military service after the end of the season.

Transfers

Tactics

Tactical analysis

Starting eleven and formation

Substitutes

See also
 FC Seoul

References

 FC Seoul 2018 Matchday Magazines

External links
 FC Seoul official website 

FC Seoul seasons
Seoul